This is the list of members of the European Parliament for the United Kingdom in the 1989 to 1994 session. Note that during the session, the parliamentary groups to which both major British parties belonged underwent changes. On 1 May 1992, the European Democrats group, consisting mostly of members of the Conservative Party, dissolved and its members were accorded 'associate party' status by the EPP group. On 21 April 1993, the Socialist Group, which included members of the Labour Party, was renamed the Party of European Socialists group.

List

References 

1989
List
United Kingdom